"No Fear" is a song co-written and recorded by Canadian country music artist Terri Clark.  It was released in January 2001 as the second single from the album Fearless.  The song reached #27 on the Billboard Hot Country Singles & Tracks chart.  The song was written by Clark and Mary Chapin Carpenter.

Chart performance

References

2001 singles
2000 songs
Terri Clark songs
Songs written by Mary Chapin Carpenter
Songs written by Terri Clark
Song recordings produced by Keith Stegall
Mercury Records singles